Olivia Jane d'Abo (born 22 January 1969) is a British actress and singer. She is known for her roles as Karen Arnold, Kevin Arnold's rebellious teenaged hippie sister in the ABC comedy-drama series The Wonder Years (1988–1993), as female serial killer Nicole Wallace in Law & Order: Criminal Intent, as Marie Blake on The Single Guy (1995–1997), and Jane Porter in The Legend of Tarzan (2001–2003). Her film appearances include roles in Conan the Destroyer (1984) and Bank Robber (1993).

Early life and education
D'Abo was born on 22 January 1969 in London, England, the daughter of Maggie London, an English model and actress primarily active in the 1960s, and Mike d'Abo, an English singer and member of 1960s musical group Manfred Mann. She has an older brother, two half-brothers and one half-sister: elder brother Ben, younger half-brother Bruno, and younger sibling twins Ella and Louis (born July 2007) on her father's side. Olivia and Ben both attended high school in the United States at Los Feliz Hills School (formerly the Apple School) in Los Angeles, and d'Abo attended Pacoima Junior High School in Pacoima, Los Angeles.

She is the first cousin once removed of her father's cousin Maryam d'Abo (b. 1960), the actress best known for her performance as Kara Milovy in the 1987 James Bond film The Living Daylights. Olivia and Maryam bought a house together in Los Angeles when Olivia was 19 years old.

Career

Acting career
D'Abo's film debut was the supporting role of Princess Jehnna in Conan the Destroyer, released on 29 June 1984. Two months later, she appeared in the supporting role of Paloma the peasant girl in Bolero (1984).

D'Abo portrayed Karen Arnold in the ABC comedy-drama series The Wonder Years for the show's first four seasons, from 1988 to 1991, with two guest star appearances in the show's final two seasons. In 1992, she guest-starred in the Star Trek: The Next Generation episode titled "True Q" as Amanda Rogers.

An unreleased pilot for an ABC sitcom she led, Olivia Masters' Life, was released on her official website. The pilot shows young, tenacious American woman Olivia Masters as she tries to find her calling and acclimate herself into the professional world, which is not always professional or a breeze, as she finds out.

D'Abo made five appearances as a recurring villain Nicole Wallace in the NBC police procedural drama series Law & Order: Criminal Intent between 2002 and 2008. She reprised the character in the 2013 episode "The Catacombes" in the French police procedural drama series Jo, a show created by René Balcer, who also created Criminal Intent.

In 2007, D'Abo played Abby Carter, the ex-wife of Sheriff Jack Carter, in the Sci-Fi Channel series Eureka for two episodes. She has had numerous supporting roles in other television series and films, such as The Spirit of '76 (1990), Greedy (1994), The Big Green (1995), and The Twilight Zone (2002). Onstage, she appeared in the 2005 Broadway theatrical production of The Odd Couple alongside Matthew Broderick and Nathan Lane.

In animation, D'Abo provided the voices of Sonya Blade in Mortal Kombat: Defenders of the Realm (1996); Melanie Walker/Ten in Batman Beyond (1999–2000); Star Sapphire in Justice League (2001); and Morgaine le Fey in Justice League Unlimited (2004); Tak in Invader Zim (2001–2002); Jane Porter in The Legend of Tarzan; Jedi Master Luminara Unduli in Star Wars: The Clone Wars (2008), which she reprised the character in the cameo role in Star Wars: The Rise of Skywalker (2019); Carol Ferris in Green Lantern: First Flight (2009); and Natalia Romanoff in Ultimate Avengers, and Ultimate Avengers 2: Rise of the Panther (both 2006).

In February 2013, D'Abo began filming for Tesla Effect: A Tex Murphy Adventure (working title: Project Fedora), a video game that combined live-action footage with 3D graphics.

Music career
D'Abo is a singer-songwriter, guitarist, and pianist. She has composed and performed for various soundtracks. Her single "Broken" is in the film Loving Annabelle. Her debut album, Not TV, was released in July 2008.

D'Abo also performed backing vocals for Julian Lennon's Help Yourself, and a duet with Seal's "Broken". She also co-wrote the song "Love Comes from the Inside" with Italian singer Laura Pausini, which was featured on Pausini's English-language debut album, From the Inside.

D'Abo performed a duet on Bon Jovi's "Livin' on a Prayer" for their 2003 acoustic album This Left Feels Right.

Podcast appearances
In October 2015, d'Abo started a weekly podcast called Every Friday with Dan and Olivia, co-hosting the program with Dan Miles of the Friends of Dan music podcast.

On 8 July 2016, d'Abo appeared on Ken Reid's TV Guidance Counselor podcast.

Personal life
She was formerly engaged to singer Julian Lennon; the engagement ended in 1992.
She also dated James Quakenbush from 2019-2022. 

Olivia became engaged to actor Thomas Jane in 1998 after working with him on several projects such as "The Velocity of Gary" and "Jonni Nitro." In 2001 the couple called off the engagement.

She has one son, Oliver William d'Abo (b. 1995), and was married to songwriter and music producer Patrick Leonard from 2002 to 2012.

Filmography

Film

Television

Video games

Theatre

References

External links
 
 
 

1969 births
Living people
Actresses from London
Actresses from Los Angeles
Olivia
English child actresses
British emigrants to the United States
English film actresses
English people of Dutch descent
English songwriters
English stage actresses
English television actresses
English voice actresses
Singers from London
Singers from Los Angeles
Songwriters from California
Writers from Los Angeles
21st-century American women
20th-century English actresses
21st-century English actresses
20th-century English women singers
20th-century English singers
21st-century English women singers
21st-century English singers